Bright Lights and Country Music is a studio album by Bill Anderson and the Po' Boys. It was released in November 1965 on Decca Records and was produced by Owen Bradley. It was Anderson's first studio album to include dual credit with his band, The Po' Boys. It was his fourth studio album overall. The album included one single release, the title track. This song became a major hit on the Billboard country charts. The album itself also reached charting positions on Billboard shortly after its release.

Background and content
Bright Lights and Country Music was recorded in July 1965 at the Columbia Recording Studio. The sessions were produced by Owen Bradley, whom Anderson had been collaborating with for several years. It was Anderson's first studio album that included lead credit with his band, The Po' Boys. The album consisted of 12 tracks. Like his previous studio releases, the album contained several songs written by Anderson. Among these songs was the title track, which appeared as the first song in the set. Other songs were new recordings and cover versions songs recorded by others. Among the record's covers was "The Wild Side of Life", which was first released by Hank Thompson in the 1950s. Another cover was the fifth track, "How the Other Half Lives". This song was first recorded by Wynn Stewart and Jan Howard as a duet.

Release and reception
Bright Lights and Country Music was released in November 1965 on Decca Records. The album was released as a vinyl record, with six songs on side of the recording. The album peaked at number 6 on the Billboard Top Country Albums chart on February 12, 1966. It became Anderson's fifth album release to reach a position on this chart. The title track was the only single released from the album. It was issued in August 1965 and became a major hit, peaking at number 11 on the Billboard Hot Country Singles chart in November 1965. The song "Golden Guitar" would later be included as a B-side to a single not included on this album. The album was later reviewed by Allmusic, which gave the release a rating of 4.5 out of 5 possible stars.

Track listing

Personnel
All credits are adapted from the liner notes of Bright Lights and Country Music.

Musical personnel
 Bill Anderson – lead vocals
 Harold Bradley – guitar, banjo
 James Colvard – guitar
 Floyd Cramer – piano
 Pete Drake – steel guitar
 Ray Edenton – guitar
 Jimmy Gateley – guitar
 Roy Huskey – bass
 The Jordanaires – background vocals
 Jimmy Lance – guitar
 Grady Martin – guitar
 Len Miller – drums
 Bob Moore – bass
 Weldon Myrick – steel guitar
 The Po' Boys – various
 Joe Zinkan – bass

Technical personnel
 Owen Bradley – producer
 Hal Buksbaum – photography

Chart performance

Release history

References

1965 albums
Albums produced by Owen Bradley
Bill Anderson (singer) albums
Decca Records albums